Pleasant Run is a tributary of the South Branch Raritan River in central New Jersey in the United States.

Pleasant Run was originally called Campbell's Brook after John Campbell of Piscataway.  Campbell in 1685, was granted a strip of land extending west from the South Branch and which surrounded Pleasant Run.

Tributaries
Pleasant Run has twenty-three small, unnamed tributaries in Branchburg and Readington.

Crossings
Readington
Springtown Road (4 crossings)
CR 523/Flemington-Whitehouse Road
Pleasant Run Road
US 202
Old York Road

Branchburg
Otto Road
Pleasant Run Road
South Branch Road

See also
List of rivers of New Jersey

References

Tributaries of the Raritan River
Rivers of New Jersey
Rivers of Somerset County, New Jersey
Rivers of Hunterdon County, New Jersey